Aaron Abraham Shikler (March 18, 1922 – November 12, 2015) was an American artist noted for portraits of American statesmen, such as the official portrait of John F. Kennedy, and celebrities such as Jane Engelhard and Sister Parish.

Early life
Shikler was born in Brooklyn, New York on March 18, 1922. His parents were Eastern European Jewish immigrants who came to the United States before World War I. After graduating from The High School of Music & Art in 1940, Shikler studied at the Tyler School of Art in Philadelphia, and at the Hans Hofmann School in New York. Drafted in 1943, he served in the U.S. Army Air Corps during World War II as a cartographer in Europe. He married Barbara Lurie, whom he met at Tyler, and had two children, Cathy Shikler van Ingen and Clifford Shikler with her. Barbara was diagnosed with lung cancer and died in 1998. Barbara “Pete” Shikler continued to be his muse even after her death.

Work
Jacqueline Kennedy personally selected Shikler in 1970 to provide the posthumous character study of John F. Kennedy, Oil Portrait of John F. Kennedy, which serves as Kennedy's official White House portrait. He also painted the official White House portraits of First Ladies Jacqueline Kennedy and Nancy Reagan, as well as portraits of the Kennedy children
and is represented in numerous public collections such as The Brooklyn Museum of Art, The Metropolitan Museum of Art, the Hirshhorn Museum and Sculpture Garden, the New Britain Museum of American Art, and the National Academy of Design.

Awards and honors
Shikler was elected a centennial fellow of Temple University in 1985, an academician of the National Academy of Design in 1965 and an associate of the National Academy of Design in 1962.  Shikler received the Louis Comfort Tiffany Award in 1957 and the Thomas B. Clarke Prize in 1958, 1960, and 1961.  In 1976, he received the State Department Traveling Grant, a Certificate of Honor at the Tyler School of Art and the Benjamin Altman Prize from the National Academy of Design.

Death 
Shikler continued to paint in his studio at home until he died of kidney failure on November 12, 2015, surrounded by his family. He was survived by his two children, Cathy and Clifford, and 4 grandchildren: Isabella, Lane, Montgomery and Bejamin.

Gallery

References

External links 
Oil Portrait of John F. Kennedy
Brief biography at the Davis & Langdale gallery
Renowned Painter Aaron Shikler Reveals Stories behind Famous White House Portraits

1922 births
2015 deaths
20th-century American painters
American male painters
21st-century American painters
American portrait painters
Artists from Brooklyn
Painters from New York City
Temple University alumni
National Academy of Design associates
The High School of Music & Art alumni
United States Army Air Forces personnel of World War II
20th-century American male artists